Agelena howelli is a species of spider in the family Agelenidae, which contains at least 1,315 species of funnel-web spiders . It was first described by Benoit, in 1978. It is primarily found in Tanzania.

References

Endemic fauna of Tanzania
howelli
Arthropods of Tanzania
Spiders of Africa
Spiders described in 1978